Simone Mondiali Rota (born November 6, 1984) is a Filipino footballer who plays as a defender or a midfielder for Philippines Football League club Kaya-Iloilo.

Early life
Rota was left in an orphanage of Buklod Kalinga run by Franciscan sisters in Parañaque when he was a baby and was raised by Sister May Memorial, who he considers a second mom to him. A woman named Sonia Tulay reportedly left Rota in the convent at about two months old in November 1984.

Rota was eventually adopted by Maurizio and Marilena Rota, a couple from Italy who were taxi drivers. Rota has a sister, Valentina, who was also born on the 6 of November and adopted from the Philippines.

Italian missionary Mother Flora Zippo, assisted in finding people which would adopt Rota.

Rota spent most of his career in Europe, especially in Italian-speaking region.

Club career

Italy
Rota entered the first team of Pro Sesto in the 2001–02 Serie C2 season, becoming a regular the following year. In 2005, the team was promoted to Serie C1 as the Group A winner of the 2004–05 Serie C2 season. Subsequently, Rota was also selected for the Mirop Cup as a member of Italy U-20 Lega Pro. Their team went up against the youth national teams of Styria, Croatia, Hungary, and Slovenia, and eventually Italy's U-20 Lega Pro team was named the champion of that tournament.

Rota also capped for the Italy U-20 Lega Pro team in the 2005 Trofeo Dossena, which lost to Sport Club Internacional in the final game. He did not suit up for Italy in the final match of that tournament. In January 2006, Rota was transferred from Pro Sesto to Manfredonia. By the end of that season, Manfredonia finished tenth, and Pro Sesto was relegated. Rota returned to Pro Sesto as a regular, though he missed the rest of the season.

In November 2007, Rota returned to Pro Sesto, playing eight games of the season. He was then transferred to Lugano of Swiss Challenge League in 2008. In 2009, Rota returned to Pro Sesto, but the club went bankrupt and it finished last in the 2009–10 Lega Pro Seconda Divisione.

Philippines
In October 2013, Rota showed interest in playing in the United Football League to have more chances of being selected by the Philippines national football team. He signed with Stallion FC in January 2014.

In January 2017, Ceres-Negros announced that they had signed Rota, along with few other players, to play for the club. He went on to join Davao Aguilas later in the year.

International career

Italy 
Rota represented the Italy U20 Lega Pro team at the 2005–06 Mirop Cup.

Philippines 
Rota received his first call up for the Philippines national football team in February 2014, making his international debut in a friendly match against Malaysia on 1 March 2014. He scored his first international goal in the 2014 AFC Challenge Cup group stage match against Laos on 22 May 2014.

In August 2016 Rota suffered a serious ACL tear that would rule him out for the rest of the year, including the 2016 AFF Championship in which the Philippines are the host.

Personal life 
Since his return to the Philippines in 2014 Rota makes a point of volunteering at the orphanage where he grew up. Rota is an A.C. Milan fan, and although he fluently speaks Italian, he has difficulty speaking English and Filipino. Rota has multiple tattoos, including the outline of the Philippines archipelago and the names of his sister, adopted mother and father on his right forearm and a prayer and Sister May's name on his left forearm.

Rota's biography has been depicted in the film Journeyman Finds Home: The Simone Rota Story which was directed by Albert Almendralejo and Maricel Cariaga.

Career statistics

International
Scores and results list the Philippines' goal tally first.

References

External links 

Profile at Football.ch  

Profile at AIC.Football.it  

1984 births
Living people
People from Parañaque
Footballers from Metro Manila
Italian people of Filipino descent
Italian footballers
Filipino footballers
Association football defenders
S.S.D. Pro Sesto players
FC Lugano players
Philippines international footballers
Filipino expatriate footballers
Filipino expatriate sportspeople in Switzerland
Expatriate footballers in Switzerland
Filipino emigrants to Italy
Naturalised citizens of Italy
Stallion Laguna F.C. players
Ceres–Negros F.C. players
Davao Aguilas F.C. players
Filipino adoptees
Asti Calcio F.C. players